The Rankine vortex is a simple mathematical model of a vortex in a viscous fluid. It is named after its discoverer, William John Macquorn Rankine.

The vortices observed in nature are usually modelled with an irrotational (potential or free) vortex. However, in potential vortex, the velocity becomes infinite at the vortex center. In reality, very close to the origin, the motion resembles a solid body rotation. The Rankine vortex model assumes a solid-body rotation inside a cylinder of radius  and a potential vortex outside the cylinder. The radius  is referred to as the vortex-core radius. The velocity components  of the Rankine vortex, expressed in terms of the cylindrical-coordinate system  are given by

where  is the circulation strength of the Rankine vortex. Since solid-body rotation is characterized by an azimuthal velocity , where  is the constant angular velocity, one can also use the parameter  to characterize the vortex.

The vorticity field  associated with the Rankine vortex is

Inside the core of the Rankine vortex, the vorticity is constant and twice the angular velocity, whereas outside the core, the flow is irrotational. In reality, vortex cores are not always exactly circular; and vorticity is not uniform within the vortex core.

See also 
 Kaufmann (Scully) vortex – an alternative mathematical simplification for a vortex, with a smoother transition.
 Lamb–Oseen vortex – the exact solution for a free vortex decaying due to viscosity.
 Burgers vortex

External links
Streamlines vs. Trajectories in a Translating Rankine Vortex: an example of a Rankine vortex imposed on a constant velocity field, with animation.

Notes

Equations of fluid dynamics
Vortices